Alangium nobile is a tree in the dogwood family Cornaceae. The specific epithet  is from the Latin meaning "noble" or "distinguished", likely referring to the growth habit.

Description
The smooth bark is brown.

Distribution and habitat
Alangium nobile grows naturally in Sumatra, Peninsular Malaysia and Borneo. Its habitat is forests from sea-level to  altitude.

References

nobile
Trees of Sumatra
Trees of Peninsular Malaysia
Trees of Borneo
Taxonomy articles created by Polbot